Dolichocephala walutikina is a species of dance flies in the fly family Empididae.

References

Empididae
Insects described in 2005
Diptera of Asia